3+ is a Latvian pay television channel owned by the Modern Times Group broadcasting to the Russian-speaking community in Latvia from the United Kingdom. It was launched on 1 November 2003.

Its programming consists of simulcasts of Russian entertainment shows, and benefits from MTG's ownership in STS Media and Peretz.

3+ is the second most popular Russian channel in Latvia with a viewing share of 5.2% in May 2007, ahead of REN TV Baltic, but after the dominating First Baltic Channel.

3+, as with other channels of the All Media Baltics group in the Baltic states, switched to HD broadcasting on 26 July 2018.

References

External links
 

Television channels in Latvia
TV3+ Latvia
Television channels and stations established in 2003